Cristine Sue Rose (born January 31, 1951), sometimes credited as Christine Rose, is an American actress. She is best known for her role as Angela Petrelli on the hit NBC science fiction drama Heroes.

Early life
Rose was born in Lynwood, California, and is a graduate of Stanford University.

Career
She was a regular on the short-lived television series Ferris Bueller which was a TV remake of the famous film Ferris Bueller's Day Off which she co-starred with a then unknown Jennifer Aniston. She also had major recurring roles on Picket Fences as Lydia Brock, as Barbara Norton on Grace Under Fire, and on Providence as Cynthia Blake. She also had recurring roles on Ellen as Susan, and on Charmed as Claire Pryce, in both shows' premiere seasons; both characters were the boss of the series lead's characters in their respective jobs.

Rose he has had guest roles in various shows, including 7th Heaven, Life Goes On, Friends, Days of Our Lives, Passions, Party of Five, The Wonder Years, Matlock, Malcolm in the Middle, Ally McBeal, Murder, She Wrote, Boston Legal, Diagnosis: Murder, Nash Bridges, CSI: Crime Scene Investigation, NCIS, NCIS: Los Angeles,  The Practice, L.A. Law, Chicago Hope, Crossing Jordan, ER, St. Elsewhere, Star Trek: The Next Generation, Gilmore Girls, Kate & Allie, Murphy Brown, Newhart, Growing Pains, How I Met Your Mother, Sabrina, the Teenage Witch, Clueless, Dharma and Greg, Life with Bonnie, The Nanny, The Jamie Foxx Show, The King of Queens,  Two and a Half Men, Big Love, The Mentalist,  Six Feet Under, and Charmed.

From 2006 to 2010, Rose played Angela Petrelli on the NBC series Heroes. In 2008, her role went from recurring to series regular. She reprised her role in 2015 as part of the miniseries Heroes Reborn. As for her roles in movies as of 2009, she had a small role in the movie He's Just Not That Into You and was one of the main supporting characters on the Disney Channel television movie Go Figure.

Filmography

Film

Television

Theater

References

External links

 

1951 births
Living people
Actresses from Los Angeles County, California
People from Lynwood, California
American film actresses
American stage actresses
American television actresses
Stanford University alumni
20th-century American actresses
21st-century American actresses